UTC−02:30 is an identifier for a time offset from UTC of −02:30.

As daylight saving time (Northern Hemisphere summer)
Principal city: St. John's

North America
Canada – Newfoundland Time Zone
Newfoundland and Labrador
Labrador 
The area between L'Anse-au-Clair and Norman Bay
Newfoundland

References

UTC offsets